Molly Aunty Rocks!  is a 2012 Malayalam film directed by Ranjith Sankar, starring Revathi in the title role along with Prithviraj. It has been released on 14 September 2012 to positive reviews from critics and audience alike. The positive energy that is maintained throughout is the highlight of this movie, opined Audience.

Synopsis
Molly is an unstoppable woman, who will do only what she feels is right. Molly's world is unique and she is its unquestioned queen. Pranav is an egoistic bureaucrat of the premier and exclusive Indian Revenue Service, who wants his system and power to rule over the subjects. When both of them clash, sparks fly and egos would not relent. Will Molly rock or will Pranav get her locked?

The movie was largely shot in Nemmara & Chittilamcherry of Palakkad District.

Cast
 Revathi as Molly Aunty
 Prithviraj as Pranav Roy IRS Assistant Commissioner of Income Tax
 Lalu Alex as Benny
 K.P.A.C. Lalitha
 Mamukkoya as Salim
 Krishna Kumar as Ravi
 Sharath as Kochachan
 Shivaji Guruvayoor as Menon
 Sunil Sukhada as Shamsudheen
 Lakshmi Priya as Usha
 Rajesh Hebbar as Sunny
 Kavitha

Release and reception
The film released on 14 September 2012 got a positive reception. Sify rated the film as very good and praised Revathy for her performance. Sify says "Molly Aunty Rocks is a gripping and engaging tale of a woman, who is well aware about what she wants from life. She is egoistic but her thoughts are noble". Sify gives the verdict "Go for it. Good".

Paresh C Palicha on Rediff.com rates it 3/5 and says "Molly Aunty really Rocks". He says in his review "Hats off to writer-director Ranjit Sankar who has made a superhero out of Revathy. She hogs the limelight here in a way she has not done in the prime of her career.Revathy plays the part with dignity and grace. She remains likeable throughout because of the control she keeps and the special effort that the director has made to keep her a genuine person and not make her an oddity.Director Ranjit Sankar and Revathy make Molly Aunty rock." However, IBNLive termed the movie as average. Aswin J Kumar of The Times of India was also not impressed with the film and gave it a rating of 2/5.

Sify.com updated the Box Office status of Molly Aunty Rocks as "Molly Aunty is a Winner at BO". It says in the article "Director Ranjith Sankar's Molly Aunty Rocks has gained the maximum response from the viewers, among the four Malayalam releases of last weekend. "The collections were average for the first two shows on Friday and things started looking better from the evening shows. Sunday was really great and things are looking absolutely bright right now," says Ranjith Sankar."

Accolades

References

2012 films
2010s Malayalam-language films
Films set in Kerala
Films shot in Kerala
Films shot in Palakkad
Films directed by Ranjith Sankar